The 2006 Italian general election was the first in the country's history in which Italian and dual citizens living outside the country could vote by postal ballot in international electoral districts. Twelve members of the Italian Chamber of Deputies and six members of the Italian Senate were elected in this way.

Italian and dual citizens in North America and Central America (including the Caribbean) elected one member of the Italian Senate. The winning candidate was Renato Turano of Romano Prodi's election coalition, The Union.

The process
All electors could vote for a political list and also cast a first preference vote for a specific candidate. The party with the highest number of list votes won the Senate seat, and the winning party's candidate with the most first preference votes was declared elected.

The parties
Seven electoral lists contested the North and Central American Senate division. The same lists also fielded candidates for the Chamber of Deputies and North and Central America.

Prime minister Silvio Berlusconi's right-wing Forza Italia party ran its own slate. Two other parties aligned with Berlusconi's government ran separate lists: the moderate conservative Union of Christian and Centre Democrats and Mirko Tremaglia's right-wing For Italy in the World, which was specifically focused on diaspora issues. (Another party in Berlusconi's coalition, the Lega Nord, also appeared on the ballot, although this seems to have been due to a technical error).

The main opposition group from the previous parliament, Romano Prodi's centre-left Union party, ran a united slate. One of the Union candidates noted that the state of the party lists favoured his group's chances of election.

The centrist Independent Alternative for Italians Abroad also fielded a list, as did the far-right Tricolour Flame party.

Each of the party lists comprised two candidates, except for the Northern League and Tricolour Flame which fielded one apiece.

The candidates

The Union
Renato Turano is a Chicago baking executive who was active in the Italian expatriate community for several years before his election. He served in the Italian Senate from 2006 to 2008.
Rocco di Trolio was born in Calabritto, Italy. He moved to the United Kingdom at age seventeen and became active with the British Labour Party, also serving as secretary of the Italian Socialist Party in England. He joined the Italian overseas social services agency in 1981 and moved to Vancouver, British Columbia, Canada, in 1990, where he oversaw the city's Italian-Canadian social services bureau. Di Trolio became a dual Italian-Canadian citizen in 1994. He sought the New Democratic Party nomination for Vancouver East in the 1997 Canadian federal election, narrowly losing to veteran municipal politician Libby Davies. In 2004, he topped the polls in an election for Canada's Committee of Italians Abroad, a fifteen-member board whose purpose is to promote Italian culture.

Forza Italia
Augusto Sorriso was a municipal politician in Licata, Sicily, before moving to New Jersey in 1994. He also ran as a candidate of Berlusconi's People of Freedom party in the 2008 Senate election.
Robert Liborio Zambito is a municipal politician in Montreal, Quebec, Canada. He was elected to the Montreal city council in 2009.

For Italy in the World
Carlo Consiglio was fifty-four years old in 2006. Originally from the Naples area, he moved to Toronto, Ontario, Canada, in 1989. He has been active in the Italian expatriate community and has served with the General Council of Italians Abroad. In the 2006 campaign, he spoke against the legal recognition of same-sex marriage.
Vincenzo Centofanti was born in Abruzzo and spent some of his youth in Ethiopia during the Italian occupation of that country. He was still in Ethiopia when it was liberated by the British in 1941, and he was held in British surveillance camps in Kenya and Tanganyika for the next six years. Repatriated to Italy in 1947, he received a law degree in 1954 and moved to Philadelphia three years later to rejoin his family. He worked as a banker and an Alitalia executive, and was retired by the time of the 2006 campaign. He has been active with the General Council of Italians Abroad and has served as president of the Federazione delle Associazioni Abruzzesi della Valle del Delaware.

Union of Christian and Centre Democrats
Vittorio Coco is a broadcaster in Toronto, Ontario, Canada. He ran for the Italian Senate a second time in 2008 as a Union of the Centre candidate.
Bernardo Paradiso is based in New York City and has worked with the Italian American Committee of Education.

Independent Alternative for Italians Abroad
Dom (Domenico) Serafini was born in Giulianova, Abruzzo. He moved to the United States of America in 1968, at age eighteen, to attend Empire State College. He is a journalist and publisher based in New York City and is best known for publishing the television trade journal Video Age International. Serafini was one of the first declared candidates for the 2006 Senate election in North and Central America, and was described in an August 2005 article in The New York Times as an early front-runner. In January 2006, he was quoted as saying, ""My ideology is pragmatism. I'm not an ideologue. My job is to represent Italians overseas, not play politics." He later said that his primary mission if elected would be "squeez[ing] whatever is possible from Italian state and government funds for Italians overseas."
Sonia Marcella Spadoni-Alioto was born in Ferrara and later moved to San Francisco. Forty-one years old in 2006, she has a background in law and accountancy and has provided assistance for Italians living overseas in accessing Italian state services.

Lega Nord
Salvatore Rappa is initially from Sicily and lived in New York City in 2006. His appearance on the ballot as a Northern League candidate was due to a technical error; he had intended to run for the Movement for Autonomy led by Raffaele Lombardo.

Tricolour Flame
Alfredo Viti was based in Miami.

The results
Romano Prodi's Union received the most votes. Renato Turano received the most first preference votes from this list and was declared elected.

Detailed results by country
More than ninety-five per cent of votes cast in this election were from the United States of America or Canada. The American result was a virtual tie between Berlusconi's list and Prodi's list. In Canada, Prodi's list won a significant victory. Renato Turano credited the Canadian turnout as vital for his election.

Antigua and Barbuda

Bahamas

Barbados

Belize

Canada

Costa Rica

Dominican Republic

El Salvador

Grenada

Guatemala

Haiti

Honduras

Mexico

Nicaragua

Panama

United States of America

Source: ARCHIVIO STORICO DELLE ELEZIONI - Consultazione dati: Senato 09/04/2006, Area ESTERO, Ripartizione AMERICA SETTENTRIONALE E CENTRALE, Ministerio dell'Interno, Government of Italy, accessed 27 July 2011.

References

2006 elections in Italy